Harry Long was a college football coach and biology professor.

Harry Long may also refer to:

Harry Long (footballer) (1910–2003), Australian rules footballer
Harry Long, character in The Invisible Monster
Mrs Harry H. Long, who launched USS Hoel

See also
Harold Long (disambiguation)
Henry Long (disambiguation)
Long Harry, English clergyman and politician